DAAP may refer to:

 Digital Audio Access Protocol, for sharing music in Apple's iTunes
 University of Cincinnati College of Design, Architecture, Art, and Planning, at the University of Cincinnati, United States
 ICAO airport code for Illizi Airport